Jon A. Jensen (born 1963) is a lieutenant general in the United States Army. He currently serves as the 22nd director of the Army National Guard. He previously served as the adjutant general of the Minnesota National Guard from November 2017 to August 2020. Prior to that, he was assigned as commanding general of the 34th Infantry Division from January 2017 to October 2017 and as deputy commanding general for United States Army Africa from 2015 to 2017. He assumed his current assignment on 10 August 2020, with an effective date of rank of 3 August 2020.

Education
Jensen attended Lewis Central High School in Council Bluffs, Iowa, graduating in 1982. He is a 1986 graduate of Northwest Missouri State University. Jensen later earned master's degrees from the United States Army Command and General Staff College in Fort Leavenworth, Kansas and the United States Army War College in Carlisle, Pennsylvania.

Military career
Jensen enlisted into the Iowa Army National Guard as a Private (PV1) combat medic in November 1982. He served for six and a half years and reached the rank of Staff Sergeant before attending the Army's Officer Candidate School, and received his commission upon graduation in 1989. As a second lieutenant, he was assigned to the 1st Battalion of the 168th Infantry Regiment of the 34th Infantry Division. He was deployed to Kuwait in 2001, Stabilization Force in Bosnia and Herzegovina in 2003 as a major and Iraq in 2007 as a lieutenant colonel and in 2009 as colonel for a second deployment to Iraq.

Awards and decorations

Publications

References

1963 births
Living people
People from Council Bluffs, Iowa
Northwest Missouri State University alumni
Iowa National Guard personnel
United States Army Command and General Staff College alumni
United States Army War College alumni
National Guard (United States) generals
People from Apple Valley, Minnesota
Minnesota National Guard personnel